Kyra Ivania Montes Cashatt (born 21 April 1998) is an American-born Nicaraguan footballer who plays as a forward for the Nicaragua women's national team and a manager who works as a graduate assistant for college women's team Northeastern State RiverHawks.

Early life
Montes was born in San Diego, California and raised in Shreveport, Louisiana to a Nicaraguan father and an American mother.

High school and college career
Montes has attended the CE Byrd High School in her hometown, the Mississippi College in Clinton, Mississippi and the Centenary College of Louisiana in her hometown.

International career
Montes capped for Nicaragua at her senior debut during the 2020 CONCACAF Women's Olympic Qualifying Championship qualification.

Managerial career
After finishing her college playing career, Montes became the graduate assistant coach for the women's team of the Northeastern State University in Tahlequah, Oklahoma.

References 

1998 births
Living people
People with acquired Nicaraguan citizenship
Nicaraguan women's footballers
Women's association football forwards
Nicaragua women's international footballers
Nicaraguan football managers
Female association football managers
Women's association football managers
Nicaraguan people of American descent
Soccer players from San Diego
Sportspeople from Shreveport, Louisiana
Soccer players from Louisiana
American women's soccer players
Mississippi College alumni
Centenary College of Louisiana alumni
College women's soccer players in the United States
American women's soccer coaches
Northeastern State RiverHawks women's soccer coaches
American people of Nicaraguan descent